John Todd Zuhlsdorf (born October 28, 1959), also known as Father Z, is an American Catholic priest and traditionalist known for his blogging activities. Incardinated in the Diocese of Velletri-Segni, he lived and worked in the Diocese of Madison from 2014 to 2021, broadcasting a daily Tridentine Mass and issuing commentary on individuals and events from a traditionalist Catholic perspective.

Life
Zuhlsdorf was born in Minneapolis, Minnesota, in 1959. He studied classical languages and theatre at the University of Minnesota. Formerly a Lutheran, he says his conversion to Catholicism was set into motion after hearing a piece of sacred polyphony on the radio. He was ordained a priest in Rome by Pope John Paul II on May 26, 1991.

After ordination, Zuhlsdorf attended the Patristic Institute Augustinianum, which conferred a Licentiate of Sacred Theology. 

Later, Zuhlsdorf became a weekly columnist for the traditionalist newspaper The Wanderer, and has appeared on EWTN and the Fox News Channel. Since 2011 he has written a weekly column for the Catholic Herald in the UK. He is best known for his blog Fr. Z's Blog (previously named: What Does the Prayer Really Say?), in which he comments on Catholic tradition and current church events, advocates for reverent celebration of both authorized forms of the Roman Rite liturgy of the Mass, the post-Vatican II form and the 1962 Tridentine form, and for the growth of the sacrament of Penance. "The Staggers", the blog of the British magazine New Statesman, listed Zuhlsdorf's site as one of the top ten Christian blogs in the world.

In September 2017, after Zuhlsdorf wrote a post titled "Should a seminary headline a homosexualist activist as a speaker?" about a then-upcoming talk by James Martin at Theological College, a seminary located at but independent of the Catholic University of America. Martin became the subject of online criticism. Two days after the post was published, Theological College withdrew Martin's invitation. The Catholic University of America issued a statement denouncing the decision to cancel.

In January 2021, Zuhlsdorf became involved in a public dispute over his execution of a live-streamed exorcism against participants in the 2021 United States Electoral College vote count. He said he had received the permission of his local ordinary, Bishop Donald J. Hying, the bishop of the Diocese of Madison, to celebrate the exorcism as it related to the election. However, Hying disputed that statement, saying he had granted permission to Zuhlsdorf to pray the exorcism against the COVID-19 pandemic, and not for political activity.

On January 16, 2021, the Diocese of Madison announced that Zuhlsdorf had reached a mutual decision with Hying to leave his position of ministry there, and relocate to an unnamed new location. He intends to continue writing his blog. According to canon law, he will need to obtain faculties from another bishop before beginning to minister in his jurisdiction.

Zuhlsdorf is president of the Tridentine Mass Society of Madison, Wisconsin.

References

External links 
Fr. Z's blog

Living people
1959 births
20th-century American Roman Catholic priests
American bloggers
American male bloggers
Catholic media
Christian bloggers
Clergy from Minneapolis
Converts to Roman Catholicism from Lutheranism
Traditionalist Catholic priests
American traditionalist Catholics
University of Minnesota alumni
21st-century American Roman Catholic priests